The 1960 Massachusetts gubernatorial election was held on November 8, 1960. John A. Volpe was elected Governor of Massachusetts to replace Foster Furcolo.  Volpe defeated Democrat Joseph D. Ward in the race.  Also running were Henning A. Blomen of the Socialist Labor Party of America and Guy S. Williams of the Prohibition Party.

In the race for lieutenant governor, Democrat Edward F. McLaughlin, Jr., defeated Republican Augustus Gardner Means, Prohibition candidate Thomas Maratea, and Socialist Labor candidate Francis A. Votano.

Democratic primary

Candidates 
Francis E. Kelly, Attorney General
John Francis Kennedy, Treasurer and Receiver-General
Endicott Peabody, former member of the Massachusetts Governor's Council
Gabriel Piemonte, former Boston City Councilor
Alfred Magaletta, realtor
Joseph D. Ward, Massachusetts Secretary of the Commonwealth

Declined 
Foster Furcolo, incumbent Governor (to run for US Senate)

Results

Republican primary

Candidates 
John Volpe, former Massachusetts Commissioner of Public Works and administrator of the Federal Highway Administration

Withdrew following convention 
Frank S. Giles, Minority Leader of the Massachusetts House of Representatives
Philip A. Graham, State Senator from Hamilton
Howard J. Whitmore, Jr., former Mayor of Newton

Results 
Following his endorsement at the state convention, Volpe was unopposed for the Republican nomination.

General election

Results

See also
 1959–1960 Massachusetts legislature

References

1960
Gubernatorial
1960 United States gubernatorial elections
November 1960 events in the United States